The Cold Lake First Nations is a First Nations band government.  This band is the governing body for people descended from several different historic groups, hence the plural, nations, used in the band's name. In August 2019, there were 2,960 members of this band, of which 1,322 lived within five reserves, about  large within the province of Alberta.

The Dënesųłiné of Cold Lake occupy the territory around present-day Cold Lake, Alberta, in the northeast of the province close to the Saskatchewan border. They are the only Chipewyan community who are signatory to Treaty Six and are somewhat isolated from other Chipewyan. Their closest Chipewyan neighbors are situated at Ejerésche or Dillon, Saskatchewan and K'ái K'oz Desé or Janvier, Alberta, both of which are approximately 5 hours away by motor vehicle.

History

Early history 
Oral traditions of  the Cold Lake First Nations reach back in time and in traditions similar to those we can expect at the end of the last ice age. Prehistoric artifacts, such as stone tools and pottery, have been dated to over 5,000 years old. Researchers have also discovered a pre-Columbian campsite covering about 1,200 square metres along the lakeshore at English Bay. Locally known as Berry Point, the area has been used by the Denesuline for fishing, hunting and gathering medicines since time immemorial. The bones of their ancestors are buried in grave sites there.

Fur trade 
The Denesuline of Cold Lake were traditionally a nomadic people who lived off the land by hunting and gathering. Wetlands, prairie and boreal forest made up their homelands in this eco-region and was indeed plentiful in food. During the fur trade era, they trapped in and around Primrose Lake and Cold Lake where there was an abundance in fur-bearing animals such as beaver and muskrat

In 1716, the peoples in the Cold Lake area were supposedly attacked for the first time by fur trading Cree, who had become owners of firearms by trading with Europeans.
Not before 1800 the groups around Cold Lake started to trade with Europeans on their own, but then they travelled to the trading posts on the Hudson Bay and even to Hochelaga on the Saint Lawrence River.

Treaty No. 6 of the Numbered Treaties 

The Government of Canada negotiated with Woodland and Plains Cree, and some Nakota as well as with the Denesuline Peoples around Cold Lake. Treaty 6, which covers modern-day central Alberta and Saskatchewan, was signed in 1876 at Carlton and Fort Pitt.

When chief Uldahi died in June 1882, he had no successor. Consequently, the group dwelling at Heart Lake elected its own chiefs and headmen. They also tried to get a reserve of their own. On a hill above Reiter Creek they gathered in the summer of 1913 and elected Alexi Janvier (Nanuchele) as their chief. At the end of the First World War people coming back from Europe's battlefields brought with them the Spanish flu. Nearly half of the population died.

The Cold Lake Nations had been forced to give up their nomadic lifestyle. At the beginning they were quite successful farmers but meanwhile a large part of the land is leased to white farmers with more money.

North-West Rebellion 

After the Frog Lake Massacre of May 1885, the band's main group fled to the Cold Lake in fear of revenge. Despite moderation of a priest, the militia disarmed the tribe. Women and children were sent to a camp on Reiter Creek, while the men stayed in the army's camp. When the band returned to the Cold Lake, they met another armed unit there. The oral tradition tells about a mass execution, which was averted in a last-minute decision.

In 1890 many Chipewyan families went from Heart Lake (Saskatchewan) to Primrose Lake, as they were used to do traditionally, but this time they stayed there permanently.

When land surveys started in 1902 the Indians of Cold Lake were still suspected to have participated in the North-West Rebellion, so that they lost their treaty rights. In addition, the responsible Indian agent believed that their territory was much too large for only 330 members of the tribe. Consequently, they could no more live by fishing, hunting and trapping. In exchange for not losing their fishing rights, they swapped their  of land in the south of the Beaver River with a piece of land on the Cold Lake, to be more precise the English Bay. At the same time French settlers came to the French Bay.

Forced assimilation 
The Canadian residential school system was also introduced for the Cold Lake First Nations. The children had to attend residential schools like Onion Lake or Blue Quills Residential School. The legacy of the schools on aboriginal people of today has been referred to as a "collective soul wound."

Cold War and Cold Lake Air Weapons Range 

In 1930 provisions of the Alberta and Saskatchewan Acts were used to allow the confiscation of any militarily important area. During the Cold War the Royal Canadian Air Force was looking for a test area and found it around Primrose Lake. The people living there were offered a small amount of compensation for 20 years.

While the most modern techniques were introduced on CFB Cold Lake, the first power line was not installed before 1964. The residential schools were not closed before 1971, a system for which Prime Minister Stephen Harper apologized in 2008.

Reserves 
The largest reserve today is Cold Lake 149 in the east of Bonnyville (145.281 km2). There are other reserves, like the one of 4134 ha on the Beaver Creek (149B), 96.2 ha of the territory of the Blue Quills First Nation Indian Reserve, 71.6 ha on the southern shore of Cold Lake (149A) and 149C, and the land meant as a kind of compensation for the Air Base, which consists of 2023.5 ha.

References

External links 
 Cold Lake First Nations
 traditional territory

First Nations governments in Alberta
Dene governments